Thyrosticta is a genus of moths in the subfamily Arctiinae. The genus was erected by George Hampson in 1898.

Species
 Thyrosticta agatha (Oberthür, 1893)
 Thyrosticta angustipennis Le Cerf, 1924
 Thyrosticta ankaratta Griveaud
 Thyrosticta bimacula Griveaud, 1964
 Thyrosticta bruneata Griveaud, 1969
 Thyrosticta cowani Griveaud, 1964
 Thyrosticta dilata Griveaud, 1964
 Thyrosticta dujardini Griveaud, 1969
 Thyrosticta incerta Griveaud, 1964
 Thyrosticta lacrimata Griveaud, 1964
 Thyrosticta melanisa Griveaud, 1969
 Thyrosticta minuta Boisduval, 1833
 Thyrosticta octopunctata Rothschild, 1924
 Thyrosticta pauliani Griveaud, 1964
 Thyrosticta peyrierasi Griveaud, 1969
 Thyrosticta raharizonina Griveaud, 1964
 Thyrosticta ratovosoni Griveaud, 1964
 Thyrosticta rothschildi Griveaud, 1964
 Thyrosticta seguyi Griveaud, 1964
 Thyrosticta sylvicolens (Butler, 1878)
 Thyrosticta tollini (Keferstein, 1870)
 Thyrosticta triangulifera Griveaud, 1964
 Thyrosticta trimacula Mabille, 1875
 Thyrosticta vestigii Griveaud, 1964
 Thyrosticta vieui Griveaud, 1964

References

Arctiinae